Sir Claud Frederick William Russell  (8 December 18719 December 1959) was a British diplomat who was minister to Ethiopia and to Switzerland and ambassador to Portugal.

Biography
Russell was the second son of Lord Arthur Russell. He was educated privately and at Balliol College, Oxford. He joined the Diplomatic Service in 1897, was promoted to Third Secretary, then to Second Secretary in September 1902. He served in British embassies or legations in Turkey, Egypt, China, France, Russia, Morocco, Argentina, Paraguay, Spain, Greece, and in the Foreign Office. At the outbreak of the First World War he was released from the Foreign Office to serve in the Bedfordshire Yeomanry, rising to the rank of major. After the war, in 1919 he was appointed British delegate to, and president of, the international financial commission which had been established in Athens following the Greco-Turkish War (1897) to oversee the public finances of Greece, and also to the Inter-Allied Financial Commission that oversaw loans to help the Greek government recover from the war. Russell was then appointed Minister to Ethiopia 1920–25; Minister to Switzerland 1928–31; and Ambassador to Portugal 1931–35.

Claud Russell was knighted KCMG in the King's Birthday Honours of 1930. The Portuguese government awarded him the Grand Cross of the Order of Christ. During the Second World War, at the age of 69, Sir Claud enlisted in the Home Guard. He rented Trematon Castle 1939–59 and died there on his 88th birthday.

As Ambassador to Lisbon he was one of very few senior diplomats to write favourably on whether women should be admitted to the Diplomatic Service. In his contribution to the Shuster Committee review in 1934 he said, "I have an instinctive prejudice in favour of change, which I associate with improvement and reform ... I do not see why a woman should not cohabit at her post with her husband [particularly if he were] a man of letters or a craftsman of any sort ... We live in a changing world, and no-one can say how mankind will regard anything in 1959. Who would have foreseen in 1894 that in twenty-five years women would be made eligible for the House of Commons?"

Personal life 
Russell married Athenais Atchley, daughter of Shirley Clifford Atchley in 1920.

References

RUSSELL, Sir Claud Frederick William, Who Was Who, A & C Black, 1920–2008; online edn, Oxford University Press, Dec 2007, accessed 25 May 2012
Obituary: Sir Claud Russell, The Times, London, 10 December 1959, page 17

1871 births
1959 deaths
Claud
Alumni of Balliol College, Oxford
British Army personnel of World War I
Ambassadors of the United Kingdom to Ethiopia
Ambassadors of the United Kingdom to Switzerland
Ambassadors of the United Kingdom to Portugal
Knights Commander of the Order of St Michael and St George
Grand Crosses of the Order of Christ (Portugal)
Fellows of the Royal Geographical Society
Fellows of the Zoological Society of London
British Home Guard soldiers
Bedfordshire Yeomanry officers